Events from the year 1938 in Scotland.

Incumbents 

 Secretary of State for Scotland and Keeper of the Great Seal – Walter Elliot until 16 May; then John Colville

Law officers 
 Lord Advocate – Thomas Mackay Cooper
 Solicitor General for Scotland – James Reid

Judiciary 
 Lord President of the Court of Session and Lord Justice General – Lord Normand
 Lord Justice Clerk – Lord Aitchison
 Chairman of the Scottish Land Court – Lord MacGregor Mitchell, then Lord Murray

Events 

 27 April – Second Division team East Fife F.C. uniquely win the Scottish Cup in Association football.
 3 May – Empire Exhibition opens in Glasgow.
 30 July – The Beano comic, published by D. C. Thomson & Co. of Dundee, goes on sale across the U.K.
 27 September –  is launched at Clydebank; she is the largest ship in the world at this time.
 Iona Community established by Rev. George MacLeod in Glasgow.
 English landowner David Freeman-Mitford, 2nd Baron Redesdale, buys the island of Inch Kenneth.
 The Hermitage of Braid estate, adjacent to Blackford Hill, is gifted to the city of Edinburgh for recreational purposes by John McDougal.
 The Neolithic settlement of Rinyo on Rousay in Orkney is excavated by V. Gordon Childe.
 Broughton Place at Broughton in the Borders is built in the style of a traditional tower house by Basil Spence incorporating decorative reliefs by Hew Lorimer.
 Turner & Newall establish an asbestos cement plant at Dalmuir.
 Agnes Mure Mackenzie publishes The Foundations of Scotland, the first of a 6-volume history.

Births 
 2 January – Ian Brady, born Ian Duncan Stewart, serial killer (died 2017 in Ashworth Hospital)
 16 February – Willie Hamilton, footballer (died 1976 in Canada)
 7 March – Alan Cousin, footballer (died 2016)
 31 March
 Ian Gray, comics scriptwriter (died 2007)
 David Steel, UK Liberal Member of Parliament and Liberal Democrat leader and 1st Presiding Officer of the Scottish Parliament
 16 April – Gordon Wilson, Scottish National Party leader (died 2017)
 5 June – Moira Anderson, singer
 18 June – Michael Sheard, character actor (died 2005)
 27 June – David Hope, judge
 7 June – Ian St John, footballer and manager (died 2021 in England)
 28 July – Ian McCaskill, weatherman (died 2016)
 13 September – John Smith, UK Labour Party leader (died 1994 in London)
 14 September – Nicol Williamson, actor (died 2011)
 20 October – Iain Macmillan, photographer (died 2006)
 22 October – Alan Gilzean, footballer (died 2018)
 25 November – Maria Fyfe, née O'Neill, politician (died 2020)
 28 November – Frank Haffey, goalkeeper
 16 December – Neil Connery, actor, younger brother of Sean Connery (died 2021)
 John Paisley, actor, working in China
 Roland Poska, graphic artist (died 2017 in the United States)

Deaths 
 31 January – Sir James Crichton-Browne, psychiatrist (born 1840)
 9 April – Moses McNeil, footballer, a founder of Rangers F.C. (born 1855)
 11 April – David Alan Stevenson, lighthouse designer (born 1854)
 25 April – Robert MacGregor Mitchell, Lord MacGregor Mitchell, Chairman of the Scottish Land Court 1934–38  (born 1875)
 29 April – James Pittendrigh Macgillivray, sculptor and poet (born 1856)
 2 July – John James Burnet, architect (born 1857)
 29 August – John Macdonald, sportsman and physician (died 1861)

The arts
 Hugh S. Roberton writes the "Mingulay Boat Song".

See also 
 Timeline of Scottish history
 1938 in Northern Ireland

References 

 
Years of the 20th century in Scotland
Scotland
1930s in Scotland